Jearld Frederick Moldenhauer was born in Niagara Falls, New York on August 9, 1946. He has been a gay activist from his college years onward, and was the founder of the Cornell Student Homophile League, the University of Toronto Homophile Association (UTHA), and The Body Politic gay liberation journal, Canada's most significant gay periodical.  He was a founding member of Toronto Gay Action (TGA), and the Toronto Gay Alliance toward Equality (GATE). On February 13, 1972 he became the first gay liberation representative to address a political party conference in Canada when he addressed a session of the New Democratic Party Waffle convention. In 1973 he began collecting the books, newspapers and ephemera that seeded and grew into the Canadian Lesbian & Gay Archives. He opened Glad Day Bookshop, the first gay and lesbian bookstore in Canada, in 1970 and operated it until 1991 when he sold the store John Scythes. In 1979 he opened a second Glad Day Bookshop in Boston, Mass. Glad Day Bookshop Toronto is now considered the oldest gay/lesbian bookshop in the world.  Glad Day Bookshop Boston closed its doors in the summer of 2000, when its lease expired and its building was sold.

Biography
Moldenhauer graduated from Cornell University in 1969. In May 1968 he founded the Cornell Student Homophile League, which was only the second such homophile group established at an American university. In 1969 he moved to Canada and worked as a research assistant in the Physiology Department at the University of Toronto. There he founded the University of Toronto Homophile Association (UTHA) which held its first meeting on October 24, 1969. UTHA was the first student homophile organization in Canada, and the first gay and lesbian group to be established in Toronto; in 1970, it inspired the founding of the Community Homophile Association of Toronto. The University of Toronto fired him for founding the gay student organization in January, 1970. Moldenhauer was photographer and demonstrator at the We Demand Rally on August 28, 1971. Significant edits to an article about the rally in the magazine Guerilla led to Moldenhauer founding The Body Politic (magazine). Moldenhauer founded the Glad Day Bookshop in November, 1970, after noticing that gay literature that was emerging after Stonewall was not available in Canada. Moldenhauer sold books out of his backpack at rallies, meetings and parties, and offered a small mail order service. In its early days, Glad Day Bookshop operated out of Moldenhauer's 4 Kendal Avenue apartment, located in The Annex. This apartment also served as The Body Politic's office. The bookstore became the first significant target of censorship of gay & lesbian literature by the Canadian government.  This escalated in 1986 when the government of PM Brian Mulroney created an internal memorandum D-9-1-1 which was distributed to all Canada Customs agents.  The memorandum essentially encouraged border agents to declare almost all incoming gay & lesbian literature to be “obscene” and therefore inadmissible. In the decade that followed Glad Day Bookshop Toronto endured four separate court cases challenging censorship.  The most famous of these was the 1987 court decision that overturned the banning of The Joy of Gay Sex  by Charles Silverstein and Edmund White. On February 13, 1972 he became the first gay liberation representative to address a political party conference in Canada when he addressed a session of the New Democratic Party Waffle convention.

References

External links
 ''Jearld Moldenhauer fonds at The ArQuives: Canada's LGBTQ2+ Archives''

Canadian LGBT businesspeople
Living people
Cornell University alumni
Canadian LGBT rights activists
Canadian LGBT journalists
1946 births
People from Niagara Falls, New York